South Carolina On My Mind is a song written and recorded by South Carolinians Hank Martin and Buzz Arledge. It was adopted by South Carolina as a second state song on March 8, 1984.  It joined "Carolina," which has been a state song since 1911.

Adoption 
First proposed on May 12, 1983, the bill's preamble explain the rationale for a second state song:

"AN ACT TO DESIGNATE 'SOUTH CAROLINA ON MY MIND' AS AN OFFICIAL STATE SONG.

Whereas, a beautiful inspiring ballad entitled 'South Carolina On My Mind' has been created, sung, and recorded by Hank Martin and Buzz Arledge, both native South Carolinians who are now professional musicians in Nashville and New York; and

Whereas, the South Carolina Department of Parks, Recreation and Tourism provided initial encouragement to Hank and Buzz and introduced "South Carolina On My Mind" in a record distributed to radio stations and in other advertising and promotion materials used extensively by television and other media; and

Whereas, Hank and Buzz have used their own resources to produce a "South Carolina On My Mind" album that features the South Carolina ballad and ten other songs recorded by these talented musicians; and

Whereas, the three most prestigious national music publications have promoted "South Carolina On My Mind", resulting in widespread usage of the song by radio stations across the nation; and

Whereas, Hank and Buzz have scheduled personal appearances to sing the song at several South Carolina Governor's Conferences, the halftime show of a University of South Carolina football game, the Pendleton Spring Jubilee, and other major events; and

Whereas many South Carolina organizations have used "South Carolina On My Mind" as a theme song at national conventions and other programs, and the University of South Carolina basketball team, the Lancaster Rhythm, the Conway CART, and other organizations are using the song for entertainment and promotional purposes; and

Whereas, "South Carolina On My Mind" has penetrated the hearts of countless numbers of Americans and residents of other nations who have heard Hank and Buzz sing this ballad; and

Whereas, millions of these people have become favorably impressed with South Carolina as a direct result of their exposure to the song, and many of them now have "South Carolina on Their Mind" and are coming to our State as vacationers and potential future residents. Now, therefore,

...

SECTION 1. 'South Carolina On My Mind' is designated as an official state song to help inspire pride in our State and improve the quality of life among all South Carolinians, and to promote the image of South Carolina beyond our borders by further developing tourism and industry through the attraction of vacationers, prospective investors, and new residents."

References 
Music of South Carolina
United States state songs
Songs about South Carolina